The Khyber Rifles are a paramilitary regiment, forming part of the Pakistani Frontier Corps Khyber Pakhtunkhwa (North). The Rifles are tasked with defending the border with Afghanistan and assisting with law enforcement in the districts adjacent to the border. Raised in the late nineteenth century, the regiment provided the title and setting for the widely read novel, King of the Khyber Rifles, and is the oldest regiment of the Corps.

History

During the period of British rule, the Khyber Rifles was one of eight "Frontier Corps" or paramilitary units recruited from the tribesmen of the North West Frontier, serving as auxiliaries for the regular British Indian Army. Raised in the early 1880s as the Khyber Jezailchis; (a jezail being a type of home made musket),  the Khyber Rifles recruited from Afridi tribesmen, with British commanders seconded from regular British Indian army regiments. Subordinate officers were Afridis. The first commandant was Sir Robert Warburton, son of an Anglo-Irish soldier Robert Warburton of the Bengal Artillery and his wife Shah Jehan Begum, an Afghan princess. Sir Robert remained the commandant until his retirement in 1899. His deputy, Colonel Sir Aslam Khan Sadozai, the first Muslim commandant, succeeded him. Then, the deputy to Colonel Sir Aslam Khan Sadozai was Malik Afridi Khan of Mulazai. Although the deputy, Malik Afridi Khan spent most of his time as the acting in charge of the Khyber Rifles due to the extensive leave of Sir Aslam.

19th Century campaigns
The regiment saw active service in the Black Mountain expeditions of 1888 and 1891, during a period when the Khyber Pass itself remained peaceful. In August 1897 however, the Khyber Afridi tribes rose and the three forts garrisoned by the Khyber Rifles were overrun, the survivors falling back to Jamrud. It took four months and forty-four thousand troops for the British to retake the Khyber Pass. The Khyber Rifles were reconstituted and resumed their garrisons at Landi Kotal, Fort Maude and Ali Masjid.

Disbandment and re-establishment
During the Third Anglo-Afghan War (1919), the loyalty of the Khyber Rifles was put under heavy strain and there were a number of desertions. The regiment was therefore disbanded as unreliable. Of the serving personnel 1,180 opted to be discharged, while smaller numbers transferred to a military police battalion or were formed into a newly raised Khyber Levy Corps.

The Khyber Rifles was however reconstituted from Afridi veterans of World War II in 1946, with its headquarters at Landi Kotal. The commander of the reborn regiment was himself an Afridi, Sharif Khan.

In August 1947, upon partition, the Khyber Rifles and the other Frontier Corps regiments were transferred to Pakistan. In addition to its traditional policing duties in the tribal areas of the Khyber region, the Khyber Rifles provided detachments to serve in Kashmir and East Pakistan. The regiment is currently involved in tracking down fugitives and terrorists.

Locations
The headquarters of the Khyber Rifles were at Landi Kotal. Its prime role was to guard the Khyber Pass. The three main garrisons of the regiment were Landi Kotal, at the western end of the Pass, Fort Maude to the east, and Ali Masjid in the centre.

Insignia and uniform
The badge of the Corps comprised two crossed Afghan daggers with the words KHYBER above and RIFLES below.

While the Indian Army as a whole was noted for its colourful and elaborate dress uniforms prior to 1914, the various units of the Frontier Corps wore only plain khaki drill uniforms and turbans.

Units
 Headquarters Wing
 101 Wing
 102 Wing
 103 Wing
 104 Wing
 105 Wing
 106 Wing
 107 Wing
 Field Battery

See also

 King of the Khyber Rifles (1919 novel)
 Shagai Fort
 Civil Armed Forces
 Law enforcement in Pakistan

References

Further reading
 Chevenix, Charles. "Frontier Scouts". Cape, London 1985

External links
 Journey to Khyber Rifles: Commandant's Diary 2005-2008

Military units and formations of British India
Regiments of the Frontier Corps
Frontier Corps Khyber Pakhtunkhwa (North)